The Shin-Ei was a Go competition.

Outline
The Shin-Ei was a Go competition held where players under the age of 30 and 7 dan would compete in.

Past winners

Go competitions in Japan